Rafał Wolsztyński (born 8 December 1994) is a Polish professional footballer who plays as a forward for Polish club Chrobry Głogów. He is the twin brother of Łukasz Wolsztyński.

Club career
In 2010 Wolsztyński signed for Górnik Zabrze after good performances at junior club level.

On 20 August 2020 he signed a two-year contract with Arka Gdynia.

References

External links
 
 

1997 births
People from Knurów
Sportspeople from Silesian Voivodeship
Living people
Polish footballers
Association football forwards
Górnik Zabrze players
Limanovia Limanowa players
Widzew Łódź players
Arka Gdynia players
Seinäjoen Jalkapallokerho players
Chrobry Głogów players
Ekstraklasa players
I liga players
II liga players
III liga players
Veikkausliiga players
Polish expatriate footballers
Expatriate footballers in Finland
Polish expatriate sportspeople in Finland